A hunter-killer team, is a team that separates the tasks of "hunting" and "killing" to two or more individuals.

Examples include: 
 Two-person sniper teams, one using specialized optical hardware and the other a rifle
 Pairs of F-4G Wild Weasel V and F-16Cs, where the F-4G "hunter" could detect, identify, and locate an enemy's radar and then direct the F-16C's weapons to the site
 Bradley fighting vehicles often "hand off" fire missions to M1 Abrams main battle tanks in their hunter-killer team
 "Pink teams" of scout and attack helicopters, such as OH-6 "Loach" or OH-58 Kiowa scout helicopters and the AH-1 Cobra attack helicopter during the Vietnam War
 In anti-submarine warfare an Maritime patrol aircraft may be employed as "hunter", with surface ships such as destroyers as killers.
 Task Forces such as Task Force 88 where one element, the "hunter," (e.g., CIA Operatives) gathers intelligence on the target while the other, the "killer," (e.g., Delta Force or Rangers) acts on the intelligence and eliminates the target.

Operations

Hunter killer operations are prolonged operations conducted in irregular warfare by a unique and specifically organized force, in conjunction with an indigenous force, against irregular warfare adversaries by operating behind the lines or in hostile, safe haven, or semi permissive environments, employing unorthodox tactics, for the sole purpose of achieving attrition and punitive actions predominantly against the personnel, leadership, and resources of the enemy.

Principles
Hunter-killer forces and operations:
 are best employed during irregular warfare environments
 require independent maneuver in enemy territory
  should not be formed ad hoc
 require specialized training in enemy tactics and weaponry, long-range endurance operations, infiltration and exfiltration techniques, and combat techniques
 require equal or superior maneuverability and mobility to the enemy in order to succeed

Advantages
The hunter-killer approach provides:
 versatility through its combination of combat power, reconnaissance capability, and survivability.
 the ability to effectively acquire information aggressively, perform security, and conduct counter-reconnaissance.
 control of any predicament the team is in, and of the operational tempo, denying this to the enemy.
 psychological effects on the enemy, specifically their will to fight.

References

Military units and formations